The Franklin O-425 (company designation 6AG/6V6) was an American air-cooled aircraft engine that first ran in the mid-1940s. The engine was of six-cylinder, horizontally-opposed layout and displaced . The O-405-13 (6V6-300-D16FT) of 1955 was a vertically mounted, turbocharged and fan cooled version for helicopters.

Variants
6AG6-245Geared propeller drive at 0.623:1,  at 3,300 rpm, (XO-425-5).

6AGS6-245Supercharged and geared,  at 3,200 rpm, (XO-425-3).

6V6-245-B16FVertically mounted, fan-cooled helicopter version,  at 3,275 rpm,  (XO-425-1).

6V6-300-D16FTVertically mounted, turbocharged, fan-cooled helicopter version,  at 3,275 rpm, (O-425-13).

O-425-1

O-425-2

O-425-3

O-425-5

O-425-9

O-425-13

Applications
Convair XL-13
Republic YOA-15 (intended) 
Sikorsky S-52
Sikorsky YH-18
Stinson L-13

Specifications (O-425-5)

See also

References

Further reading
 
 
 

Franklin aircraft engines
1940s aircraft piston engines
Boxer engines